Hospital Playlist is a South Korean television series written by Lee Woo-jung and directed by Shin Won-ho. It is the second installment of the Wise Life series, following Prison Playbook (2017–18). It stars Jo Jung-suk, Yoo Yeon-seok, Jung Kyung-ho, Kim Dae-myung, and Jeon Mi-do.

The first season aired on tvN every Thursday from March 12 to May 28, 2020. Each episode was released on Netflix in South Korea, Asia-Pacific, Latin America and English speaking countries after their television broadcast. By the conclusion of the first season, the series became the ninth highest-rated Korean drama in cable television history at the time.

The second season aired between June 17 and September 16, 2021. According to Nielsen Korea, the first episode recorded 10.007% viewership, setting the record for the highest premiere ratings in the network's history.

Premise 
Hospital Playlist follows the lives of five doctors in their forties, Lee Ik-jun (Jo Jung-suk), Ahn Jeong-won (Yoo Yeon-seok), Kim Jun-wan (Jung Kyung-ho), Yang Seok-hyeong (Kim Dae-myung) and Chae Song-hwa (Jeon Mi-do), working at the Yulje Medical Centre, who first became friends during medical school. 
Lee Ik-jun is an assistant professor of general surgery specializing in liver transplants and a single father to his only son Woo-joo (Kim Joon) after getting divorced from his absent wife. His cheerful charisma allows him to connect with both patients and doctors, making him a popular figure in the hospital. 
A devout Catholic, Ahn Jeong-won is the son of the founder of the hospital and an assistant professor of pediatric surgery, cherished by his patients for his caring and sensible personality. However, seeing his patients suffer causes him distress, so he is secretly planning to become a priest against the wishes of his mother, Jung Ro-sa (Kim Hae-sook). 
Kim Jun-wan is an associate professor and later head of the cardiothoracic surgery department at Yulje, admired and feared by his subordinates due to his exceptional surgical skills and his cold demeanor. He has known Ik-jun and his family, including his lively sister Ik-sun (Kwak Sun-young), since childhood. 
Yang Seok-hyeong is an assistant professor of obstetrics and gynaecology perceived as aloof and sometimes detached due to his introverted personality, but he is in reality attentive and understanding toward his patients. He is divorced and has a complicated family history, but deeply cares about his mother. 
The only woman in the group of friends, Chae Song-hwa, is an associate professor of neurosurgery, considered as the perfect doctor by her colleagues and patients alike thanks to her brilliant career, accommodating disposition and bright personality.

Cast

Main 
 Jo Jung-suk as Lee Ik-jun, an assistant professor of general surgery. He is recently divorced after his wife decided that a long distance marriage like theirs was not an ideal situation. He is currently raising his son on his own. 
 Yoo Yeon-seok as Ahn Jeong-won/Andrea, an assistant professor of pediatric surgery. He is the son of the founder of the hospital. His older brothers are priests and his older sisters are nuns. He has been applying to enter a seminary and become a priest. 
 Jung Kyung-ho as Kim Jun-wan, an associate professor of cardiothoracic surgery, became chief of the CS department later on. He is currently in a relationship with Ik-jun's younger sister. 
 Kim Dae-myung as Yang Seok-hyeong, an assistant professor of obstetrics and gynecology. 
 Jeon Mi-do as Chae Song-hwa, an associate professor of neurosurgery.

Supporting

Doctors
 Shin Hyun-been as Jang Gyeo-ul, third-year resident, later fellow in general surgery. As the only resident for general surgery, specialist doctors typically rely on her assistance for cases outside their scope. 
 Jung Moon-sung as Do Jae-hak, chief resident, later fellow in cardiothoracic surgery.
 Ahn Eun-jin as Chu Min-ha, second-year, later chief resident in obstetrics and gynecology.
 Kim Jun-han as Ahn Chi-hong, third-year resident in neurosurgery.
 Moon Tae-yoo as Yong Seok-min, chief resident, later fellow in neurosurgery.
 Ha Yoon-kyung as Heo Sun-bin, third-year, later fellow in neurosurgery.
 Choi Young-joon as Bong Gwang-hyun, assistant professor of emergency medicine.
 Seo Jin-won as Min Gi-joon, professor of neurosurgery.
 Kim Hye-in as Myung Eun-won, second-year, later chief resident in obstetrics and gynecology resident.
 Choi Young-woo as Cheon Myung-tae, professor of cardiothoracic surgery.
 Shin Do-hyun as Bae Joon-hee, fellow in emergency medicine.
 Jeon Kwang-jin as Jong Se-hyuk, fellow in orthopedic surgery.
 Lee Se-hee as Kang So-ye, fellow in emergency medicine.
 Woo Jung-won as Yeom Se-hee, professor of obstetrics and gynecology.
 Lee Do-hye as Ki Eun-mi, first-year resident in obstetrics and gynecology.

Nurses and medical students
 Kim Soo-jin as Song Soo-bin, surgical ward nurse.
 Yoon Hye-ri as So Yi-hyun, cardiothoracic surgery medical assistant.
 Yang Jo-ah as Hwang Jae-shin, neurosurgery medical assistant.
 Lee Noh-ah as Lee Young-ha, surgical ward nurse.
 Lee Dal as Kim Jae-hwan, surgical ward nurse.
 Lee Hye-eun as Kook Hye-sung, general surgery medical assistant.
 Lee Ji-won as Han Hyun-hee, pediatric surgery medical assistant.
 Lee Soo-hyun as Nam Ji-min, pediatric intensive care unit nurse.
 Lee Jong-won as Kim Geon-eun, second-year medical student.
 Lee Jung-won as Hwang Ji-woo, second-year medical student.
 Kim Ji-sung as Han Seung-joo, obstetrics and gynecology delivery room nurse.
 Seol Yu-jin as Eun Sun-jin, obstetrics and gynecology medical assistant.
 Kim Bi-bi as Ham Deok-joo, transplant coordinator.
 Park Han-sol as Sunwoo Hee-soo, emergency room nurse.
 Cho Yi-hyun as Jang Yun-bok, third-year medical student, later intern and Hong-do's twin sister.
 Bae Hyun-sung as Jang Hong-do, third-year medical student, later intern and Yun-bok's twin brother.
 Kim Kang-min as Im Chang-min, intern.
 Lee Chan-hyung as Choi Seon-young, intern.
 Chae Min-hee as So-yeon.

Family members of the main characters
 Kwak Sun-young as Lee Ik-sun, Ik-jun's younger sister.
 Kim Joon as Lee Woo-joo, Ik-jun's son.
Lee Soo-mi as Aunty Wang, Woo-joo's nanny.
Ki Eun-se as Yuk Hye-jeong, Ik-jun's ex-wife.
 Kim Hae-sook as Jung Ro-sa, Jeong-won's mother.
 Sung Dong-il as Ahn Dong-il/Peter, Jeong-won's eldest brother.
 Kim Kap-soo as Joo Jong-soo, Chairman of the Yulje Foundation and Ro-sa's childhood friend.
 Cho Seung-yeon as Joo Jun, Director of Yulje Medical Center.
 Moon Hee-kyung as Jo Young-hye, Seok-hyeong's mother.
 Park Ji-yeon as Yoon Shin-hye, Seok-hyeong's ex-wife.
Shin Hye-kyung as Seok-hyeong's former mother-in-law.
 Nam Myung-ryeol as Yang Tae-yang, Seok-hyeong's father.
 Lee So-yoon as Kim Tae-yeon, Yang Tae-yang's mistress.

Special appearances

 Hwang Young-hee as liver transplant patient's mother (Ep. 1) 
 Yeom Hye-ran as Min-young's mother (Ep. 1)
 Kim Sung-kyun as Jung-won's second eldest brother (Ep. 1) 
 Ye Ji-won as Jung-won's eldest sister (Ep. 1) 
 Jang Hee-jung as Bit-na's mother (Ep. 1)
 Song Duk-ho as KWMC resident (Ep. 1)
 Oh Yoon-ah as Jung-won's second eldest sister (Ep. 1) 
 Park Hyung-soo as Lawyer Pyeon (Ep. 1 & 10–12) 
 Jung Jae-sung as Chief of Neurosurgery (Ep. 1) 
 Lee Joo-myung as Song PD (Ep. 1) 
 Kim Gook-hee as Gal Ba-ram (Ep. 2) 
 Kim Dae-gon as Gal Ba-ram's husband (Ep. 2)
 Kim Sung-cheol as No Jin-hyung (Ep. 2) 
 Kim Han-jong as Gong Hyung-woo (Ep. 2) 

 Lee Soo-geun as radio host (Ep. 3; voice) 
 Eun Ji-won as radio host (Ep. 3; voice) 
 Shim Dal-gi as Chan-hyung's mother (Ep. 3) 
 Gi Eun-se as Yuk Hye-jung (Ep. 3) 
 Anupam Tripathi as Foreign patient's co-worker (Ep. 4) 
 Go Ara as Go Ara (Ep. 5–6) 
 Kim Dong-kyu (Ep. 5; voice) 
 Choi Moo-sung as Ik-jun's patient's husband (Ep. 7) 
 Lee Ji-hyun as Shin Min-ji (Ep. 7) 
 Kim Sun-young as Ik-jun's patient (Ep. 7) 
 Cha Soo-rin as Oh Yu-min (Ep. 9)
 Jung Min-sung as Lee Chang-hak (Ep. 11–12) 
 Park Bo-kyung as Chang-hak's wife (Ep. 11-12) 
 Lee Jae-in as So-mi (Ep. 11) 

 Cha Chung-hwa as Yeonwoo's mother (Ep. 1) 
 Ahn Si-ha as Kim Soo-jung (Ep. 1) 
 Ryu Hye-rin as Seung-won's mother (Ep. 2) 
 Ko Na-young as Yoo Kyung-jin (Ep. 2–3)  
 Lee Ji-ha as Yoo Han-yang and Yoo Kyung-jin's mother (Ep. 2–3) 
 Lee Ji-hyun as Min-chan's Mother (Ep. 2, 4)
 Lee Kyu-hyung as  Yoo Han-yang (Ep. 3) 
 Im Soo-jung as Chae Eun (Ep. 3) 
 Ahn Chang-hwan as  Baek Hyung-do (Ep. 3; voice) 
 Jung Seung-gil as son of the brain tumor patient  (Ep. 8) 

 Yoo Jae-myung as Shin Sung-eui, professor of radiology (Ep. 9) 
 Hyun Jung-hwa as professor of nuclear medicine (Ep. 9) 
 Lee Bom-so-ri as OB-GYN fellow (Ep. 9)
 Joo Sae-hyuk as fellow in nuclear medicine (Ep. 9) 
 Lee Il-hwa as Gyeo-ul's mother (voice) 
 Park Jung-woo as Jang Ga-eul, Gyeo-ul's younger brother (Ep. 10) 
 Na Yeong-seok as Jang Young-seok, the father of Mo-ne and Ma-ne (Ep. 10) 
 Choi Deok-moon as Chu Cheol-woo, Min-ha's father (Ep. 10) 
 Jang Hye-jin as Min-ha's mother (Ep. 10) 
 Kim Jun-han as Ahn Chi-hong (Ep. 11)

Production

Development
In January 2019, it was reported that Shin Won-ho would direct a medical television series and that the production team was in the early stages of casting actors. Screenwriter Lee Woo-jung and director Shin Won-ho previously worked together on the critically acclaimed Reply (2012–16) anthology series as well as the hit black comedy series Prison Playbook (2017–18). Actors Jung Kyung-ho and Yoo Yeon-seok also previously worked with the duo. It took four years for the script to be completed. In order to comply to the 52-hour week system and to avoid overnight filming with regard to the cast and crew's health, the production team decided to air one episode a week for a total of twelve weeks instead of broadcasting two episodes a week for eight weeks as it is usually the case for South Korean television series.

Filming
Principal photography for the first season started in early October 2019. Some scenes taking place in Gangwoon University Hospital and Yulje Medical Center were respectively filmed in Hallym University Dongtan Sacred Heart Hospital (in Hwaseong, Gyeonggi) and Ewha Womans University Medical Center (in Gangseo District, Seoul), though the latter scenes of the season were filmed on set due to the COVID-19 pandemic. Filming for the first season was completed in late April 2020.

Originally scheduled to begin in early December 2020, filming for the second season was postponed to late January 2021 due to the COVID-19 pandemic. Filming ended on September 6, 2021.

Music

Albums

Season 1 

The Hospital Playlist original soundtrack produced by Ma Joo-hee was released on June 4, 2020, by Studio MaumC, Egg Is Coming and Stone Music Entertainment. It consists of covers of popular Korean songs released in the 1990s and 2000s. All songs charted on the Gaon Digital Chart and twelve on the K-pop Hot 100, with some receiving several nominations and awards. Doyeon Lee of Billboard noted that the soundtrack "was well received by listeners of all ages for its remakes of popular 90s hits."

Season 2 

The soundtrack album peaked on number 8 on weekly Gaon Album Chart and as of October 2021, 31,468 copies have been sold.

Tracklist

Singles

Future 
Shin initially developed Hospital Playlist with three seasons in mind, which should've been released across three years, but at the end of season two he expressed uncertainty toward the future of the series, citing exhaustion and other problems as reasons. Both the cast members and the production team stated they would be willing to work on a future season. Jeon Mi-do said that she often talks about an eventual third season with her four other co-stars and they take "turns to nag the director" about it.

Episodes

Reception

Critical response
Hospital Playlist received positive critical feedback. Comparing the series to  Grey's Anatomy and Friends, Ariana Yaptangco of Elle featured it on the list of "The 10 Best K-Dramas To Binge-Watch On Netflix".

During an interview with The Korea Herald, film critic Yun Suk-jin praised Hospital Playlist for emphasizing the human aspect of the profession rather than the life-and-death situations, noting that the series "did away with the cliched power conflict, and focused on the doctors' sincerity in their work and their relationship with the patients." Pierce Conran of South China Morning Post named Hospital Playlist one of the best South Korean series of 2020, mentioning that "emotional tales of illness and grief play out against the gentle camaraderie of a group that finds solace from the hardships of their job in each other, and their delightfully lousy five-piece garage band." Jessicha Valentina of The Jakarta Post named Jeon Mi-do's character Chae Song-hwa "one of the series' highlights," praising Hospital Playlist for its portrayal of strong female characters.

Joel Keller of Decider gave a mixed review, saying that the series "is a bit of a strange amalgamation of different genres, but the cast makes it work. Just be ready for a slightly confusing first episode."

Cultural impact 
Hospital Playlist has positive impact in bringing awareness of the importance of organ donation. The number of hopeful registrants for organ donation, which decreased significantly due to the COVID-19 pandemic (pandemic) in 2020, increased significantly last year due to the effect of the 2021 drama, which warmly depicts various donation cases with various stories. According to the National Long-Term Tissue Haematological Management Centre on September 14, 2022, the number of registered applicants who wanted to donate organs, human tissues, and haematopoietic stem cells, which was 147,761 in 2019, decreased by 17,417 (11.8%) to a large number of confirmed cases of COVID-19 in Korea in 2020, but increase 35.7% to 178,871 in 2022.

Viewership
Season 1
Hospital Playlist aired on tvN, which normally has a relatively smaller audience compared to free-to-air TV/public broadcasters (KBS, SBS, MBC and EBS). Its first season ended within the top 10 of the highest-rated Korean dramas in cable television history.
Season 2
A 10.0% viewership rating was recorded nationwide for the first episode of the second season, making it the highest premiere rating of the network. The last episode, aired on September 16, recorded an average national viewership of 14.080%, which is the highest ratings of the season.

Season 1

Season 2

Accolades

Notes

References

External links
   (season 1)
   (season 2)
 

  (season 1)
  (season 2)
  

TVN (South Korean TV channel) television dramas
2020 South Korean television series debuts
2021 South Korean television series endings
South Korean medical television series
Television shows set in Seoul
Television productions postponed due to the COVID-19 pandemic
Korean-language Netflix exclusive international distribution programming